Shāhid al-Islām ibn Shams al-Ḥaqq as-Sardār al-Jasarī (15 March 1960 – 27 January 2023), or simply Shahidul Islam, was a Bangladeshi Islamic scholar and politician. He was a member of Parliament for the Narail-2 constituency, after winning a by-election in 2002.

Early life and education 
Shahidul Islam was born on 15 March 1960 to a Bengali Muslim family in Jhiltuli, Faridpur, East Pakistan. His father, Shamsul Haque Sardar, hailed from Lohagara in Narail (formerly under Jessore District). In 1988, he received his Masters degree in Hadith studies from Jamia Uloom-ul-Islamia in Karachi, Pakistan. He then undertook a degree in Islamic jurisprudence and received the title of mufti.

Career 
In 1988, he founded Al Markazul Islami and served as its founding president. He was a member of the Majlis-ash-Shura of the Islami Oikya Jote, and served the senior depurt-Amir of the Bangladesh Khelafat Majlis.

Islam contested in the Narail-2 constituency during the 2001 8th parliamentary election, but lost his seat to Sheikh Hasina by 4,233 votes. Sheikh Hasina, who is the leader of the Awami League, won numerous seats in the country and gave up the Narail-2 seat. A by-election was held in 2002, in which Shahidul Islam was successfully elected.

References 

1960 births
2023 deaths
People from Narail District
8th Jatiya Sangsad members
Islami Oikya Jote politicians
20th-century Bengalis
21st-century Bengalis
Deobandis
Jamia Uloom-ul-Islamia alumni
Bengali Muslim scholars of Islam
Bangladeshi Sunni Muslim scholars of Islam